Martin J. Sammon (October 14, 1977 – October 15, 2022) was an American blues keyboardist. He was recognized for his energetic performances, improvisation and mastery of traditional styles (ragtime and blues).  Sammon has established himself as an ambassador of Chicago blues appearing on several commercially distributed DVDs, television shows (US and in Europe) and Grammy Award winning albums. His book Blues Keyboard Method, with a foreword by Chuck Leavell, of the Rolling Stones, was published by Hal Leonard in 2015.

Life and career
Born and raised on the South Side of Chicago, in a family with Irish heritage, Sammon began learning to play the piano as a young child. He learned traditional Irish folk songs by ear while listening to records with his father, Martin Sammon Sr., a Chicago police officer. His parents realized that their son was a prodigy son with an ear for music and encouraged him to take piano lessons. He enjoyed the experience but also developed his musical ear by listening to many styles of music. He competed in contests, including the World Championship Old-Time Piano Players (winning championships in 1994 and 1995).

At the age of 15, he began playing on the Chicago blues scene with the South Side guitarist L.V. Banks. He was under age and was driven to venues by his father.

Sammon began receiving calls to play with many Chicago artists, including Phil Guy. He performed and toured with Guy and other blues musicians for years, while also performing headlining gigs, including a tour in Latvia. The turning point of his career came when he played with Guy at the original Checkerboard Lounge during the weekend of the Chicago Blues Festival.

After five years with Otis Rush, in which he played on Rush's 2003 DVD, Live Part One, and on Martin Scorsese Presents the Blues: A Musical Journey (which won Grammy Awards for Best Historical Album and Best Album Notes) - Godfathers and Sons, Sammon was contacted by Phil Guy: "It was late night and I was home when the phone rang. I didn't know the number so I ignored it. My brother Mike convinced me to answer saying that 'that could be THE call!' It was Phil Guy saying that I had the Buddy gig and, by the way, Y'all leave Thursday. I'll be forever grateful to Phil and to my bro for that!"

Sammon has performed worldwide with Buddy Guy and as an opening act with his own ensemble, the Marty Sammon Band. He contributed to Guy's sixth Grammy Award–winning album, Living Proof. He has also recorded numerous releases under his own name. Sammon also performed at schools and universities to promote the blues and music career development education.

In September 2015, Sammon made an uncredited appearance on the television program Bizarre Foods with Andrew Zimmern, in the episode "Delicious Destinations—Milwaukee".

On October 14, 2015, Sammon performed with Buddy Guy and Tom Hambridge at the White House for "A Celebration of American Creativity: In Performance at the White House", commemorating the 50th anniversary of the National Endowment for the Humanities.

Sammon's influences included Peter Sliwka, Dr. John, Scott Joplin, Professor Longhair, Keith Jarrett, Chick Corea, Otis Spann, Pinetop Perkins, Ray Charles, Eubie Blake, Fats Waller, Stevie Wonder, Donny Hathaway, Curtis Mayfield, and Bruce Hornsby.

Sammon died on October 15, 2022, at the age of 45.

Discography

References

External links

World Championship Old Time Piano Website
Guitar Center Sessions on Direct TV - Buddy Guy
Yamaha - Marty Sammon
Jive Records Group Biography and Production Credits
 
 

1977 births
2022 deaths
American blues singers
American blues pianists
American male pianists
American blues guitarists
American male guitarists
Songwriters from Illinois
Electric blues musicians
Chicago blues musicians
Blues musicians from Illinois
Guitarists from Chicago
21st-century American male singers
21st-century American singers
21st-century American pianists
21st-century American guitarists
American male songwriters
American ragtime musicians